The 1940 Summer Olympics, officially known as the Games of the XII Olympiad, were originally scheduled to be held from September 21 to October 6, 1940, in Tokyo City, Empire of Japan. They were rescheduled for Helsinki, Finland, to be held from July 20 to August 4, 1940, due to the 1937 Japanese invasion of China, but were cancelled because of World War II. Helsinki eventually hosted the 1952 Summer Olympics, while Tokyo later hosted the 1964 and 2020 Summer Olympics, the latter being postponed to 2021 due to the COVID-19 pandemic.

1940 Tokyo Olympics (cancelled)
The campaign to choose a city for 1940 began in 1932, with Barcelona, Rome, Helsinki, and Tokyo participating. Tokyo city officials suggested a campaign as a means of international diplomacy following Japan's alienation from the League of Nations due to the Mukden Incident, in which Japan occupied Manchuria and created the puppet state of Manchukuo.

While both Tokyo officials and International Olympic Committee (IOC) representatives were behind the campaign, the national government, which was ever more interested in military matters, did not have any strong supporters for such a diplomatic gesture. In 1936, Tokyo was chosen in a surprise move, making it the first non-Western city to win an Olympic bid.

1930s Japan and international sports
During the 1930 Far Eastern Games in Tokyo, Indian participants were spotted flying the flag of their independence movement rather than the flag of British India. This caused a complaint from the British Olympic Association. In 1934 Japan attempted to invite European colonies to  the Far Eastern Games.

Planning

The main stadium was initially to be the Meiji Jingu Gaien Stadium — later used at the 1964 Summer Olympics — reconstructed to accommodate 100,000 spectators; however the Shrines Bureau of Home Ministry, which had jurisdiction over the Meiji Jingu precinct, strongly opposed the reconstruction. Subsequently, a new stadium was planned at the Komazawa Olympic Park, away from the city center. The Olympic Village was to be built on the present sites of Kinuta Park or Todoroki Gorge. A schedule was drawn up, and guidelines were printed in four languages. Monthly magazines and posters were printed and distributed internationally. Construction began on some buildings, and arrangements were made with hotels, travel agents, and airlines for easy access.

Forfeiture of Games
When the Second Sino-Japanese War broke out on July 7, 1937, Ichirō Kōno, a member of the Imperial Diet (legislature), immediately requested that the Olympics be forfeited. The 1938 Far Eastern Games were also canceled, but Japan's IOC delegates persisted under a belief that the war would soon be over. Amid the intensification of the war, the feasibility of both the Summer Olympics and the 1940 Winter Olympics grew increasingly questionable to other countries, who suggested a different site be chosen and spoke of the possibility of boycotting the Games were they to proceed in Japan.

In March 1938, the Japanese provided reassurances to the IOC at the organization's Cairo conference that Tokyo would still be able to serve as the host city. However, many Diet members in Japan had already openly questioned hosting the Olympics in wartime, and the military was demanding that the organizers build the venues from wood because they needed metals for the war front. In July, a legislative session was held to decide the matters of the Summer and Winter Olympics and the planned 1940 World's Fair all at once. The World's Fair was only "postponed", under a belief that Japan would be able to wrap up the war, but the Olympics could not be moved and was canceled. Had 1940 Olympics taken place, Tokyo would have become the second city to have hosted Olympic thrice (1940, 1964 and 2020)

Kōichi Kido, who would later be instrumental in the surrender of Japan in 1945, announced the forfeiture on July 16, 1938. He closed his speech saying, "When peace reigns again in the Far East, we can then invite the Games to Tokyo and take that opportunity to prove to the people of the world the true Japanese spirit." This would come to pass in 1964.

Despite the cancellation of the 1940 Olympics, the Tokyo organizing committee released its budget for the Games.  In a departure from standard practice, the budget included all capital outlays as well as direct organizing costs.  The total budget was ¥20.1 million, one-third of which would have been paid by the Tokyo metropolitan government.

Helsinki and other competitions

The IOC then awarded the Games to Helsinki, Finland, the city that had been the runner-up in the original bidding process. The Games were then scheduled to be staged from July 20 to August 4, 1940. The Olympic Games were suspended indefinitely following the outbreak of World War II (the Winter War in particular) and did not resume until the London Games of 1948.

With the Olympics canceled, the major international athletics event of the year turned out to be the annual Finland-Sweden athletics international, held at the new Helsinki Olympic Stadium, exceptionally held as a triple international among Finland, Sweden and Germany.
Gliding was due to be an Olympic sport in the 1940 Games after a demonstration at the Berlin Games in 1936. The sport has not been featured in any Games since, though the glider designed for it, the DFS Olympia Meise, was produced in large numbers after the war.

Meanwhile, Japan hosted the 1940 East Asian Games in Tokyo, with six participating nations. Helsinki eventually held the 1952 Summer Olympics, while Tokyo held the 1964 Summer Olympics and the 2020 Summer Olympics, although the later event was postponed to 2021 due to the COVID-19 pandemic.

During August 1940, prisoners of war celebrated a "special Olympics" called the International Prisoner-of-War Olympic Games at Stalag XIII-A in Langwasser, near Nuremberg, Germany. An Olympic flag, 29 by 46 cm in size, was made of a Polish prisoner's shirt and, drawn in crayon, it featured the Olympic rings and banners for Belgium, France, Great Britain, Norway, Poland, and the Netherlands. A feature film, Olimpiada '40, produced by the director Andrzej Kotkowski in 1980 tells the story of these games and of one of the prisoners of war, Teodor Niewiadomski.

Torch run
 After the successful invention of the torch relay in Nazi Germany four years earlier, the proposed method of bringing the Olympic Flame from Nazi Germany to Japan was proposed by air delivery, in the  Messerschmitt Me 261 Adolfine long-range aircraft, which was designed to have a maximum range of some 11,024 km (6,850 mi) unrefueled.

See also

1964 Summer Olympics
 The first Olympics to be postponed rather than cancelled.
2020 Summer Olympics

Notes

References
Official preliminary report. In English

Further reading

 International Journal of the History of Sport, vol. 24, 2007, No. 8, Special Issue: The Missing Olympics: The 1940 Tokyo Games, Japan, Asia and the Olympic Movement

 
Cancelled Olympic Games
Events cancelled due to World War II
1940 in multi-sport events
Summer Olympics by year